Mednis (feminine: Medne): is a Latvian-language surname meaning "capercaillie" or "wood grouse". People with that name include:

 Arnis Mednis (born 1961), Latvian singer
 Edmar Mednis (1937-2002), Latvian-American chess grandmaster and writer

See also
 

Latvian-language masculine surnames